Zug's slender gecko (Hemiphyllodactylus zugi) is a species of gecko. It is endemic to northern Vietnam.

References

Hemiphyllodactylus
Reptiles described in 2013
Endemic fauna of Vietnam
Reptiles of Vietnam